D. Jayakumar is an Indian politician and was a Member of the 15th Legislative Assembly of Tamil Nadu. He was the Speaker of the Tamil Nadu Legislative Assembly until his resignation on 29 September 2012. He was elected to the Tamil Nadu legislative assembly from Royapuram constituency as an Anna Dravida Munnetra Kazhagam candidate in the 1991, 2001, 2006, 2011 elections and 2016 elections for five terms. During the Tamil Nadu legislative Assembly 2021, he again contested in Royapuram Constituency and lost to the DMK candidate Ira Moorthy. He served in various cabinet positions starting from 1991 - Forests, Fisheries, Information Technology, Electricity and Finance. He is one among the senior leaders of AIADMK. In October 2020, he was appointed to 11 member Steering Committee of AIADMK and also serves as its Organizing Secretary. In the TN 2021 Election for Royapuram constituency, he was defeated by Murthy.R of DMK by a margin of 27,779 votes. He had represented Royapuram five times - 1991, 2001, 2006, 2011 and 2016.

References 

All India Anna Dravida Munnetra Kazhagam politicians
Living people
Speakers of the Tamil Nadu Legislative Assembly
Tamil Nadu MLAs 1991–1996
Tamil Nadu MLAs 2001–2006
Tamil Nadu MLAs 2006–2011
Tamil Nadu MLAs 2011–2016
Tamil Nadu MLAs 2016–2021
1960 births
Politicians from Chennai
Dravida Munnetra Kazhagam politicians